Staveley railway station is a railway station in Staveley in Cumbria, England. The station is on the Windermere Branch Line connecting Oxenholme and Windermere. The station is owned by Network Rail and is operated by Northern Trains who provide all passenger train services, Staveley was a request stop until December 2012.

History
The station opened on 20 April 1847. On 28 October 1887, John Studholme was using the foot crossing with the intention of getting a train to Windermere, when he was struck by an engine travelling at around 45 mph. He sustained a compound fracture to his right leg, and his collar bone was broken. At the Kendal Memorial Hospital, his leg was amputated the following day.

Until the branch line was reduced to single track in 1973, there were two platforms staggered either side of the road bridge at the east end of the station.

Facilities
The station has a single platform. There is a single waiting shelter provided, along with digital CIS display, customer help point and a telephone to offer train running details. No step-free access is available, as the only entrance is via a staircase from Station Road.

Services

On Sundays, there is an hourly service to Oxenholme and return to Windermere.

References

External links

Railway stations in Cumbria
DfT Category F2 stations
Former London and North Western Railway stations
Railway stations in Great Britain opened in 1847
Northern franchise railway stations
1847 establishments in England